Club Sportiv Municipal Flacăra Moreni,, commonly known as Flacăra Moreni or simply as Flacăra, is a Romanian football club based in Moreni, Dâmbovița County.

The team was founded by English and Dutch engineers from the local oil rig as Astra-Română Moreni in 1922. During the communist period, Flacăra was taken over by the Securitate with the involvement of director Tudor Postelnicu, who had previously worked as an iron lathe operator in the city.

In the 1988–89 season, the club finished fourth in the top flight and earned a place in the UEFA Cup. Flacăra lost 1–4 to Porto on aggregate in the first round, and at the end of the that campaign was relegated as a result of the fall of communism. It has since only played in the lower leagues.

History
Flacăra Moreni was founded in 1922 under the name of Astra Moreni. In 1951 its name changed to Flacăra Moreni. After a merger with the local rival Automecanica Moreni in the year 1977 it was called Flacăra Automecanica Moreni but in 1985 changed again to Flacăra Moreni.  Flacăra Moreni mostly played in the Divizia B and the Divizia C, but in the year 1986 they were promoted to Divizia A.  In the season 1988/89 they finished in fourth place. This meant qualification in the following season for the UEFA Cup, in which Flacăra Moreni in the first round was eliminated against FC Porto 4-1 on aggregate. In the 1990/91 Flacăra were relegated from Divizia A. After the relegation from the Divizia B in 1995 and from Divizia C in 2007 Flacăra played in the Liga IV. Flacăra were promoted to the Liga III for the 2016-17 season.

Chronology of names

Honours

Domestic

Leagues
Liga I
Best Finish 4th 1988–89
Liga II
Winners (1): 1985–86
Runners-up (1): 1951
Liga III
Winners (6): 1946–47, 1971–72, 1972–73, 1975–76, 1978–79, 1983–84
Runners-up (2): 1977–78, 2000–01
Liga IV – Dâmbovița County
Winners (1): 2015–16
Runners-up (3): 2012–13, 2013–14, 2014–15

Cups
Cupa României – Dâmbovița County
Winners (1): 2014–15

European
UEFA Cup
First round: 1989–90

Flacăra Moreni in Europe

Players

First squad players

Out on loan

Club officials

Board of directors

Current technical staff

League history

Notable players 

  Alexandru Badea
  Ion Balaur
  Teodor Beldie
  Florin Bîțică
  Iulian Chiriță
  Marin Daniel
  Marin Dragnea
  Gheorghe Dumitrașcu
  Dudu Georgescu
  Victor Glăvan
  Gigi Gorga
  Constantin Lala
  Ioan Marcu
  Dragoș Marasoiu
  Ion Mateescu
  Iulian Mihăescu
  Ion Moldovan
  Lică Movilă
  Costel Pană
  Marian Pană
  Gabriel Paraschiv
  Beniamin Popescu
  George Preda
  Dorel Purdea
  Daniel Sava
  Marian Savu
  Nelu Stănescu
  Florin Tene
  George Timiș
  Marcel Tirchinechi
  Daniel Tudor
  Nistor Văidean
  Petre Vasile
  Adrian Velicioiu
  Gheorghe Viscreanu
  Nicolae Viorel

References
 "Istoria Fotbalului Morenar" - Gheorghe Ilinca 2005
 "Fenomenul Flacara Moreni" - Articol ProSport, Andru Nenciu 2015
 www.romaniansoccer.ro

External links

 
Association football clubs established in 1922
Football clubs in Dâmbovița County
Liga I clubs
Liga II clubs
Liga III clubs
Liga IV clubs
1922 establishments in Romania